Miguel Gonçalves is a settlement in the central part of the island of Fogo, Cape Verde. It is situated at about 850 m elevation, 8 km east of the island capital São Filipe.

See also
List of villages and settlements in Cape Verde

References

Villages and settlements in Fogo, Cape Verde
São Filipe, Cape Verde